Sezze (from the Latin "Setia") is a town and comune  in the Province of Latina, central Italy, about  south of Rome and  from the Mediterranean coast. The historical center of Sezze is located on a high hill commanding the Pontine plain.

The area has been known for its fine climate since Roman times: warm and dry in summer, cool in winter.

History 
According to a legend, the city was founded by the mythical hero Hercules, after his victory over the Lestrigones, a population of giant cannibals living in southern Lazio. The town coat of arms features the white Nemean lion which Hercules slew in the first labor.

The historical Setia appeared around the 5th century BC as the Volscan settlement member of the Latin League. It became a Roman colony in 382 BC, and flourished because of its strategic and commercial position near the "pedemontana" way and the Appian Way, the road that connected Rome to southern Italy.

During the Civil War between Gaius Marius and Sulla, Setia supported the former and was later punished by the victorious Sulla (82 BC). In the Imperial period Setia was famous for its villas, and its wines were praised by Martial, Juvenal and Cicero.

According to Plutarch, Roman dictator Julius Caesar had plans to drain the wetlands around the city to create new farmland however he was assassinated before these plans could come to fruition. While not directly stated, it could be assumed this land would be cultivating grapes for the cities wine production. 

In the early Middle Ages the city had a troubled life due to its location near the main road of communication. But in 956 it was freed from the Papal authority and organized itself as a commune with laws of its own. Later, several popes sojourned in Sezze, including Gregory VII (1073), Paschal II (1116) and Lucius III (1182).

The semi-autonomous status lasted until the city, after decades of skirmishes and wars with neighboring Sermoneta and Priverno, was conquered by the troops of the Caetani family in 1381. After 12 years the Setini revolted and exterminated the occupiers and, once free, they returned under the protection of the Pope.

In 1656, after suffering the ravages of plague, and raids from Spanish and Austrian troops, the population was reduced by half.

In 1690 one of the first academies in Italy, the scientific-literary Academy of the "Abbozzati", was founded in Sezze.

In 1798 all of Lazio was occupied by French troops. The Setini rebelled, exterminating the garrison: they avoided a bitter revenge only by paying a large sum of money.

In the late 19th century the city was annexed to the newly formed Kingdom of Italy.

During World War II some churches and buildings in the historical center were destroyed by the American bombardments.

Main sights 
Many of the original city walls still exist, built of large blocks of limestone in the polygonal style. This style is also seen in several terrace walls belonging to a later date, indicated by the careful jointing and bossing of the blocks of which they are composed. Such intentional archaism is by no means uncommon in the neighborhood of Rome.

The modern town, occupying the ancient site, is an episcopal see, with a much-restored 13th-century Gothic cathedral.

There are remains of Roman villas at the foot of the hill ('Monte Trevi') on which the town stands. The two terraces date to the end of the 2nd Century BC.

Transportation 
Sezze is connected to the railway line Rome–Naples. The main road connection is the modern SS7, which bears the name of the ancient Appian Way.

Twin towns 
  Kozármisleny, Hungary, since 2004

References

Sources

External links 
 

Cities and towns in Lazio